Teressa Liane  is an Australian actress. She is known for her roles as Rhiannon Bates in Neighbours, as Mary Louise on The Vampire Diaries, Angelica on Into the Badlands and as Agrippina in the Netflix documentary drama Roman Empire.

Acting career

Teressa Liane debuted on television in 2011 as Tammy Frazer in Australian soap opera Neighbours. She returned to the serial in 2013 in the recurring role of Rhiannon Bates. She went on to star as siphoner and vampire hybrid Mary Louise in The Vampire Diaries on The CW; Angelica on Into the Badlands and Adrianne in the short film Rorrim. In 2019, Liane starred as Agrippina the Younger, Caligula's younger sister in series 3 "Caligula: The Mad Emperor" of the Netflix documentary drama Roman Empire.

Filmography

References

External links 
 

Date of birth missing (living people)
Living people
21st-century Australian actresses
Australian film actresses
Australian television actresses
People from Melbourne
Year of birth missing (living people)